Skog is a locality situated in Söderhamn Municipality, Gävleborg County, Sweden with 302 inhabitants in 2010.

References 

Populated places in Söderhamn Municipality
Hälsingland